Keben is a village in Silifke district of Mersin Province at . It is situated to the north of Turkish state highway   and Göksu River. The population of the village is 672, as of 2011. The village is famous for its main crop, namely pomegranate . This product is now proposed to be officially registered as pomegranate of Keben. Another important product is plum.

References

Villages in Silifke District